Jenkinsville is an incorporated town in western Fairfield County, South Carolina, United States, between the Broad and the Little rivers. It is located east of Monticello Reservoir and is near the Virgil C. Summer Nuclear Generating Station. Also in the area is the Kincaid-Anderson House and quarry. The town was incorporated in 2008. Jenkinsville's population at the 2010 census was 46, making it South Carolina's second smallest town.

In addition to the Kincaid-Anderson House, the Ebenezer Associate Reformed Presbyterian Church, Dr. John Glenn House, High Point, Little River Baptist Church, and Mayfair are listed on the National Register of Historic Places.

Demographics

As of the 2010 United States Census, there were 46 people living in the town. 100.0% were African American.

References

Populated places established in 2008
Towns in South Carolina
Towns in Fairfield County, South Carolina
Columbia metropolitan area (South Carolina)